Great Australian Bight Marine National Park is a marine protected area in the Australian state of South Australia located  west of the state capital of Adelaide.

The gap between the two sections is also a protected area known as the Great Australian Bight Marine Park Whale Sanctuary which was proclaimed on 22 June 1995 under the Fisheries Act 1982 (SA). The national park is also part of the group of marine protected areas which are located together in waters within Australian and South Australian jurisdictions within the Great Australian Bight and which is collectively known as the Great Australian Bight Marine Park.

The national park was proclaimed under the National Parks and Wildlife Act 1972 (SA) by the South Australian Government on 26 September 1996 principally to protect the calving waters of the Southern right whale and the Australian sea lion populations.  On 5 February 2004, rights under the state's Mining Act 1971 and the Petroleum Act 1940 and under the Commonwealth statute, the Petroleum (Submerged Lands) Act 1982,  for "entry, prospecting, exploration or mining" existing under the original proclamation were removed. Since late 2012, the national park and the whale sanctuary have also been within the boundaries of the Far West Coast Marine Park.

The national park is classified as an IUCN category II protected area.

See also
 Great Australian Bight Marine Park (2017) 
 Great Australian Bight Marine Park (Commonwealth waters)

References

External links
Entry for Great Australian Bight Marine National Park on protected planet

National parks of South Australia
Marine protected areas of South Australia
Protected areas established in 1996
1996 establishments in Australia
Great Australian Bight